For Italian football transfers summer 2011 see the following articles:
List of Italian football transfers summer 2011 (co-ownership)
List of Italian football transfers summer 2011 (June)
List of Italian football transfers summer 2011 (July)
List of Italian football transfers summer 2011 (August)

Tran
2011
Italy